Josh Rife (born December 29, 1979) is a retired American soccer player who currently coaches for the Ball State Cardinals women's soccer team.  He was announced as the head coach of the Cardinals in July 2019.

Career

Youth and College
Rife grew up in Denton, Texas, and attended Denton High School, where he was a varsity starter all four years. He played club soccer for the Texas Longhorns, a Dallas based soccer club, from the age of nine until he was eighteen years old. At the age of eleven he toured Norway, Sweden, and Denmark with a Venezuelan youth team and played in a series of tournaments where he garnered local and national attention.

He played two years of college soccer at Texas Christian University as a starting defender, before transferring to Indiana University in 2000 to pursue a higher level of play under legendary coach Jerry Yeagley. During his two years at Indiana Rife started 46 matches, was awarded first team All-Big Ten Selection in 2000 and 2001 and first team NSCAA All-Region selection in 2001, and helped the team to two College Cups, the Big Ten Tournament in 2001, and the 2000 regular season championship.

Outdoor Professional Soccer
Rife signed with the Charlotte Eagles of the USL Professional Division in 2003. He helped the team win the USL2 Championship in 2005, and was named USL-2 Defender of the Year in 2006.  Charlotte has reached its league championship game five times since 2004.

After a decade with Charlotte Eagles, Rife moved to USL Pro club VSI Tampa Bay FC at the beginning of the 2013 season.  He played 26 games, was the captain/Defender and made second-team All-USL PRO selection.  Upon completion of his inaugural season with VSI Tampa Bay FC, Rife retired from playing indoor and outdoor soccer.

Indoor Professional Soccer
Rife played professional indoor soccer with the Milwaukee Wave in the Major Indoor Soccer League.  During his 2009 – 2010 season, he was named Second Team All MISL and MISL Defensive Player of Month in January and March.  Rife led the MISL with 36 blocked shots and he played all 20 games scoring 11 goals and tallying 28 points. He previously played for the indoor teams Philadelphia KiXX and Detroit Ignition. He signed with the Philadelphia KiXX of the Major Indoor Soccer League on November 4, 2005, after a successful trial with the team the previous October, and went on to be named to the 2006 All-MISL Rookie Team.  On October 19, 2006, KiXX traded Rife to the Detroit Ignition of the Xtreme Soccer League in exchange for Don D'Ambra.  While with the Detroit Ignition Josh was named the Xtreme Soccer League Defensive Player of the Year.  He led the XSL with 31 shot blocks as Detroit won the league championship.

Coaching
Rife joined the PBA Sailfish in 2008 as Assistant Coach for the men's team.  In 2010, the team won the National Christian College Athletic Association national title.

The head coach, Jose Gomez, is Rife's former Charlotte Eagles team-mate.

Rife was announced as the head coach of the MISL's Rochester Lancers on September 13, 2013. He is the youngest coach in MISL history.

Personal
In 2006, Rife married Charlotte Lady Eagles player Christy Timbers-Rife.

References

External links
 Charlotte Eagles Player Bio
 Milwaukee Wave Player Bio
 Rochester Lancers Coach Bio
 Palm Beach Atlantic Coach Bio

Living people
1979 births
American soccer players
TCU Horned Frogs men's soccer players
Indiana Hoosiers men's soccer players
Major Indoor Soccer League (2001–2008) players
Philadelphia KiXX players
Detroit Ignition players
USL Second Division players
Charlotte Eagles players
VSI Tampa Bay FC players
Xtreme Soccer League players
USL Championship players
Major Indoor Soccer League (2008–2014) players
Soccer players from Texas
Association football defenders
Association football midfielders
Pittsburgh Riverhounds SC coaches
Mississippi State Bulldogs women's soccer coaches
Liberty Lady Flames soccer coaches
Ball State Cardinals women's soccer coaches
Major Arena Soccer League players
American soccer coaches
Sportspeople from Denton, Texas
Milwaukee Wave players
Palm Beach Atlantic Sailfish men's soccer coaches
USL League Two coaches